Hartmut Pilch (born 7 July 1963 in Freiburg im Breisgau, West Germany) is a German software developer, translator, and digital rights activist who founded the Foundation for a Free Information Infrastructure or FFII. Since 2015 Pilch supported the local Pegida movement in Munich and spoke at several Pegida rallies.

Activism
As president of the FFII, an organization that promotes software patent reform and digital freedom of speech, he oversaw an intense lobbying period aimed at EU agencies between 2002 and 2005.

In 2000, he led a campaign aimed to prevent the removal of the exclusion of computer programs as such from patenting in Art. 52(2) of the European Patent Convention. In 2003, he led again a campaign against the patentability of software in Europe. Along with the support of an extensive grassroots network, he lobbied and convinced the members of the European Parliament to amend a directive proposal on the Patentability of Computer-Implemented Inventions (initially written by the European Commission). He is also strongly opposed to the current practice of the European Patent Organisation regarding software patents.

He also founded the Eurolinux Alliance.

In November 2005, at the General Assembly of the FFII e. V., Hartmut Pilch stepped aside as president of the FFII, and Pieter Hintjens, CEO of iMatix, was elected the new FFII president. Hartmut Pilch continued on the board as vice-president of FFII and later on, as its treasurer.

Work

He is a former employee of SuSE

Pilch's work as a translator focuses primarily on Chinese and Japanese. He is also a student of Lojban, a constructed language, and has worked as an interpreter.

Personal life

He currently resides in München.

See also
FFII
Software patent

External links
Personal web page
FFII

References

1963 births
Living people
Intellectual property activism
Counter-jihad activists